The Han Solo Adventures is a trilogy of novels set in the Star Wars fictional universe by American science-fiction novelist Brian Daley. It follows the smuggling days of Han Solo and Chewbacca two years before the events of the original Star Wars film. The books were released in 1979–1980, making them the first non-movie Star Wars books published, except for Splinter of the Mind's Eye (1978). They were also the last published until The Adventures of Lando Calrissian trilogy in 1983; both trilogies were originally published by Del Rey, a division of Ballantine Books. The three Han Solo books were also published as an omnibus edition in 1992.

The events of the series are incorporated into the Star Wars Expanded Universe by being contextualized in interludes in Rebel Dawn (1998), the final book of Ann C. Crispin's Han Solo Trilogy.

Works

Han Solo at Stars' End

Han Solo at Stars' End is the first book of the trilogy. It was published in 1979. In UK editions of the novel, the character name Bollux was changed to Zollux, as the original name sounds like the word bollocks, which is regarded as profanity in the UK.

Discovering that they need a special waiver in order to operate the Millennium Falcon within the Corporate Sector without running afoul of the authorities, Han Solo and Chewbacca attempt to get in touch with Doc, an outlaw technician. However, Doc's daughter Jessa informs them that her father has vanished, presumably abducted.

Han works out a deal with Jessa: in exchange for the waiver and upgrades to the Falcon, he and Chewbacca will help out in the effort to discover what happened to Doc and other enemies of the Corporate Sector Authority, a capitalistic and authoritarian organization. As part of this effort, Han and Chewbacca escort the droid Bollux to the agricultural planet of Orron III, where they meet with Rekkon, the leader of the missing persons search. Blue Max, a small computer probe hidden away in Bollux's chest cavity, is able to infiltrate the Authority's computer network and begin searching for the location of the abductees. However, Rekkon's small group has been compromised by a traitor, and their activities are discovered. During the group's attempt to escape the planet, Chewbacca is captured by the Authority.

Han and the others manage to escape the planet aboard the Falcon. During liftoff, the traitor shoots Rekkon and destroys the data that Blue Max gathered. Before dying, Rekkon is able to leave the words "Stars' End, Mytus VII" scrawled on the Falcons game table. Han realizes that this must be the location of the Authority's prison facility. Han uses this information in a canary trap to reveal the traitor, and jettisons him into hyperspace. Han and the remaining members of Rekkon's group fly to Stars' End. Masquerading as interstellar entertainers, they infiltrate the facility and rescue their friends, including Doc and Chewbacca. The facility is destroyed, along with the administrator and most of the staff, in the escape.

Comic adaptation
From October 1980 to February 1981, writer Archie Goodwin and artist Alfredo Alcala adapted the novel in the Star Wars newspaper comic strip. The Corporate Sector was explained to be a division of the Galactic Empire, with its ships depicted as such. In 1997, Dark Horse Comics published the comic as the colorized three-issue Classic Star Wars: Han Solo at Stars' End, collecting it as a trade paperback the same year.

Han Solo's Revenge
 
Han Solo's Revenge is the second book in the trilogy. It was originally published in 1979. It features an ex-smuggler character named Roa who first took Han on the Kessel Run.

Down on their luck after a botched smuggling run, Han and Chewbacca resort to accepting a job offer from an anonymous employer. However, after flying the Falcon to the planet Lur for the pickup, they discover that the cargo they're meant to be shipping are slaves—something for which neither Han nor Chewbacca has any tolerance.

After dealing with the slavers' attempt to commandeer the Falcon, and still in dire need of funds, Han and Chewbacca head for the planet Bonadan, where the slavers' leader was meant to meet his contact for payment. Instead of the contact, though, they cross paths with Fiolla, an assistant auditor-general with the Corporate Sector Authority. She convinces Han that his only chance of getting paid now is to help her in tracking down the slaving ring.

The slavers are watching Fiolla and are now keeping their eyes on Han and Chewbacca as well, forcing the two smugglers to split up. Chewbacca takes the Falcon, while Han and Fiolla board a cruise liner. The two parties make plans to meet on the planet Ammuud, to investigate the slavers' connection to one of the governing clans there. Han and Fiolla arrive on Ammuud and uncover the evidence Fiolla needs to implicate high-ranking Authority officials in the slaving ring. Outwitting the Authority forces who have been sent by Fiolla's superior to detain them, Han and Chewbacca are able to collect their payment at last and depart the planet safely.

Han Solo and the Lost Legacy

Han Solo and the Lost Legacy is the third novel in the trilogy, published in August 1980.  Unlike the first two books, which introduced and largely fleshed out the Corporate Sector, in this book Han and Chewbacca's adventures take place in the Tion Hegemony.

While taking a well-earned break on the planet Rudrig, Han and Chewbacca are approached by Badure, an old friend, and his female companion Hasti. Badure has a lead on the fabled Queen of Ranroon, the treasure ship of Xim the Despot, which has been believed lost for centuries. Though Han is initially reluctant to join what he considers to be a pointless treasure hunt, he and Chewbacca decide to accompany Badure on his search. Accompanying them on their quest are Skynx, an alien historian from the planet Ruuria, and Han's droid companions, Bollux and Blue Max.

Han's group is not the only one on the trail of Xim the Despot's treasure. After landing on the planet Dellalt, Han and his companions are attacked and forced to abandon the Falcon. Their attackers steal the Falcon and fly her to a distant mining camp, where they intend to search her for clues to the Queen's location—by tearing the Falcon apart, if necessary. Han and the others set off on a trip overland to recover the Falcon. On their way, they are captured by a group of religious cultists, descendants of the Queen of Ranroons crew. The cultists are determined to keep Xim's treasure safe, and are about to unleash an army of Xim's war-robots to destroy the mining camp—and the Falcon.

Through the ingenuity of Bollux and Blue Max, the war-robots are stopped. Han and the others recover the Falcon and fly to the location of Xim's fabled treasure, only to find that it is not quite what they were expecting: technology and war materiel which was state-of-the-art in Xim's era, but is now commonplace, inexpensive or in some cases obsolete. Han and Chewbacca take the badly reassembled Falcon back into space, with plans to borrow money from Jabba the Hutt for an attempted Kessel Run.

Legacy
The trilogy introduces concepts such as the swoop speeder and vibroblade. Elements such as the Corporate Sector, the Tion Hegemony and the world of Etti IV were variously mentioned in other Star Wars spin-off works. The events of the series, as well as that of The Adventures of Lando Calrissian, were incorporated into the timeline of the Expanded Universe by being contextualized in interludes in the final book of Ann C. Crispin's The Han Solo Trilogy, Rebel Dawn (1998), which takes place about two years before the events of the original Star Wars film.

After The Walt Disney Company purchased Lucasfilm, it was announced that Expanded Universe works would be rebranded as Legends and no longer considered part of the official canon. The Z-95 Headhunter, which was first mentioned in Han Solo at Stars' End, has been canonized as a predecessor to the X-wing fighter in works including Star Wars: The Clone Wars. The Tion Hegemony and Etti IV were made canon in official reference material. Additionally, the skull featured on the cover of Han Solo and the Lost Legacy was included as an easter egg in the 2018 film Solo: A Star Wars Story.

References

External links
 
 Han Solo at Stars' End Official CargoBay Listing
 Han Solo's Revenge Official CargoBay Listing
 Han Solo and the Lost Legacy Official CargoBay Listing

 
Book series introduced in 1979
Star Wars Legends novels
Del Rey books
Science fiction novel trilogies
Books based on Star Wars